Federal elections were held in Switzerland on 31 October 1943. The Social Democratic Party emerged as the largest party in the National Council, winning 56 of the 194 seats.

Results

National Council

By constituency

Council of the States
In several cantons the members of the Council of the States were chosen by the cantonal parliaments.

References

Switzerland
Federal elections in Switzerland
Federal
Switzerland